The 1904 Miami Redskins football team was an American football team that represented Miami University during the 1904 college football season. Under new head coach Arthur Smith, Miami compiled a 1–5 record, being outscored 12–283.

Schedule

References

Miami
Miami RedHawks football seasons
Miami Redskins football